The Abyssinian hare (Lepus habessinicus) is a species of mammal in the family Leporidae. It is almost entirely restricted to the nations of the Horn of Africa, though it extends marginally into eastern Sudan and may also occur in far northern Kenya.

Taxonomy
It has been suggested it should be considered conspecific with the Cape hare (L. capensis), but is considered a separate species based on (presumed) sympatry in their distributions.

Description
The Abyssinian hare resembles other hares in its general appearance, long limbs and large ears. The fur is soft and dense. The upper parts are a grizzled silvery grey, with some black on the shoulder, back and rump. The flanks are paler, the individual hairs having white shafts. The underparts are white, the fur being less dense than on the back. A thin cinnamon band separates the flanks from the underparts. The chin is whitish, and some individuals have whitish eyerings. The ears are very large, silvery-brown externally and whitish-buff inside. There is a black margin round the tips of the ears and a white fringe round the lower parts of the margin.

Distribution and habitat
The Abyssinian hare is endemic to the Horn of Africa, being present in Djibouti, Eritrea, Ethiopia, Somalia and Sudan. It occurs in savannah, grassland and steppe, as well as desert and semi-arid conditions where some scrubby vegetation is present to provide cover.

References

Lepus
Mammals described in 1832
Taxonomy articles created by Polbot
Taxa named by Christian Gottfried Ehrenberg
Taxa named by Wilhelm Hemprich